A clerical error is an error on the part of an office worker, often a secretary or personal assistant. It is a phrase which can also be used as an excuse to deflect blame away from specific individuals, such as high-powered executives, and instead redirect it to the more anonymous clerical staff.

A clerical error in a legal document is called a scrivener's error.

In law 

There is a considerable body of case law concerning the proper treatment of a scrivener's error. For example, where the parties to a contract make an oral agreement that, when reduced to a writing, is mistranscribed, the aggrieved party is entitled to reformation so that the writing corresponds to the oral agreement.

A scrivener's error can be grounds for an appellate court to remand a decision back to the trial court. For example, in Ortiz v. State of Florida, Ortiz had been convicted of possession of less than 20 g of marijuana, a misdemeanor. However, Ortiz was mistakenly adjudicated guilty of a felony for the count of marijuana possession. The appellate court held that "we must remand the case to the trial court to correct a scrivener's error."

In some circumstances, courts can also correct scrivener's errors found in primary legislation.

Examples
Over 18 minutes of the Watergate tapes were supposedly erased by Richard Nixon's secretary, Rose Mary Woods, in a claimed clerical error.  Some writers have suggested that this may have changed the course of American history.

See also
Plausible deniability
Typographical error

Notes

References

Error
Clerks